Leap is an album by Drop Trio. It was completely improvised by band members Ian Varley (keyboards), Nino Batista (bass), and Nuje Blattel (drums).

Track listing
All tracks are credited to Varley/Blattel/Batista.

 "Leap"
 "The Big S.O."
 "Mothership"
 "Because Rifles Are Huge"
 "Anapodyopsis"
 "Washington's Armies"
 "Tethered"
 "Ooog Baby"
 "The Elements of Argument"
 "Two Words: Sound"
 "Robot Suit I"
 "Robot Suit II"
 "Robot Suit III"
 "Leapt"

Source:

References

External links 
 

Drop Trio albums
2004 albums
Self-released albums